The Journal of Child and Adolescent Psychopharmacology is a peer-reviewed medical journal covering psychopharmacology in children and adolescents. It was established in 1990 and is published ten times per year by Mary Ann Liebert. The editor-in-chief is Harold S. Koplewicz (Child Mind Institute). According to the Journal Citation Reports, the journal has a 2017 impact factor of 2.901.

References

External links

Psychopharmacology
Pharmacology journals
Mary Ann Liebert academic journals
Publications established in 1990
English-language journals
10 times per year journals

Child and adolescent psychiatry journals